Isaac Musekiwa (c. 1930 – 1991) was a soukous recording artist and saxophonist, in the Democratic Republic of the Congo (DRC). He was once a member of the soukous band TPOK Jazz, led by François Luambo Makiadi, which dominated the Congolese music scene from the 1950s through the 1980s.

Overview
Musekiwa was born and grew up in Southern Rhodesia (now Zimbabwe), before he migrated to Congo-Kinshasa. He became good friends with Franco and is one of those who constantly played with him all those years.

Musekiwa died in 1991.

See also
 Franco Luambo Makiadi
 Sam Mangwana
 Josky Kiambukuta
 Simaro Lutumba
 Ndombe Opetum
 Youlou Mabiala
 Mose Fan Fan
 Wuta Mayi
 TPOK Jazz
 List of African musicians

References

External links
Overview of Composition of TPOK Jazz

1930 births
1991 deaths
Year of birth uncertain
TPOK Jazz members
Democratic Republic of the Congo musicians
Zimbabwean musicians
Soukous musicians